Yvonne Bennett (born 29 July 1990) is a Northern Mariana Islander sprinter. She competed in the 100 metres event at the 2011 World Championships in Athletics.

References

External links
 

1990 births
Living people
Northern Mariana Islands female sprinters
Place of birth missing (living people)
World Athletics Championships athletes for the Northern Mariana Islands
21st-century American women